Wolf and Leopards (later issued as Wolves and Leopards) is a 1977 reggae album by Dennis Brown.

Recording
Recorded between 1976 and 1977 and released on Brown's own DEB label in the UK and on the Weed Beat label in Jamaica, the album comprises ten tracks originally released on singles that concentrate on cultural themes and mark the transformation of Brown from child star to full-fledged Rastaman. Several of the tracks were produced by Winston "Niney" Holness, with two of the key tracks, "Wolf and Leopards" and "Here I Come", co-produced by Lee "Scratch" Perry at his Black Ark studio, along with another track "In Zion", which was omitted from the album. The rhythms for these had been recorded at Randy's studio, and they were voiced and mixed at the Black Ark. "Wolf and Leopards", which criticizes criminals who posed as Rastafari as cover for their activities, was co-written by Brown, Holness and Perry (mostly by Perry according to Holness, and it was credited to Perry on its Observer Records single release), "Here I Come" was, according to Holness, written by him when he was in his twenties, and Holness also sang harmony vocals on it. The tracks on this album were among the last that Brown recorded with Holness before moving on to work with Joe Gibbs. The track was mixed by Errol Thompson. The remainder of the tracks were self-produced by Brown or by his DEB Music associate Castro Brown. The album was described in Steve Barrow and Peter Dalton's The Rough Guide to Reggae as "a benchmark album for the roots era".

Release history
The album was first issued on Brown's DEB label in the UK and on Weed Beat in Jamaica. It was later issued on the Joe Gibbs and Blue Moon labels, and was released in expanded CD form in 2006 by VP Records.

Track listing

Personnel
Dennis Brown - vocals
Sly Dunbar - drums
Dean Fraser - saxophone
Willie Lindo - guitar
David Madden - trumpet
Ronald "Nambo" Robinson - trombone
Lloyd Parks - bass
Errol Thompson - engineer
Franklyn "Bubbler" Waul - piano
Winston Wright - organ
Nigel Molden - Executive Producer

References

External links
Wolf and Leopards, Roots Archives

1977 albums
Dennis Brown albums